Frans Janssen (born 3 January 1955) is a Dutch former footballer who played as a striker.

Playing career 
Janssen started his career at VV Germania in his hometown of Groesbeek, coming through the youth system and playing for the senior side. In 1976 he signed his first professional contract with Willem II, but stayed for only a single season, when he joined NEC Nijmegen.

He played at NEC until 1991, becoming the club's all-time top scorer in the process, with 126 goals in 430 games, and was the club's top scorer on five occasions. He also helped the club to achieve promotion to the Eredivisie in 1985 and 1989. He also played in the 1983 KNVB Cup final against Ajax.

He retired aged 36 in 1991, after NEC's relegation to the Eerste Divisie.

Coaching career 
Upon retirement, he became assistant manager at NEC, working firstly under Leen Looijen and later Jan Pruijn, leaving this role in 1994. He then managed a series of lower-league sides in the Netherlands, including his first club, VV Germania, whom he led from the Tweede Divisie to the Hoofdklasse.

Personal life 
During his football career, he also worked as a roofer and started his own roofing company in 2004. Since 2009, Janssen has suffered with the lung disease COPD, meaning he is required to breathe using oxygen bottles. 

He is the father of former TOP Oss and De Treffers player Dennis Janssen.

In September 2021, a crowdfunding campaign was set up to erect statues of Janssen and Sije Visser outside the Goffertstadion.

References 

NEC Nijmegen players
Dutch footballers
Association football forwards
1955 births
Living people
Willem II (football club) players
Dutch football managers